Sajam may refer to:

Sajam is a Serbian word for "fair", see Belgrade Fair etc.
Radio Sajam -a radio station in Serbia
Sajam, Indonesia -a village in the Bird's Head Peninsula, Indonesia.